Andrew Lesuuda Papassio (b. 1981-04-15) is a male long-distance runner from Kenya.

Achievements

References

External links
 
 

1991 births
Living people
Kenyan male long-distance runners
Kenyan male marathon runners